"I Could Be" is a first solo single by American singer Sinitta. The song was released in 1983 and didn't appear on any of Sinitta's albums. The song was written and produced by James George Hargreaves and A. Ajai-Ajagbe. It was remixed by Haakon Brenner. No video was made for this song.

It was added to the special edition of her debut album Sinitta! released in 2011

Formats and track listings
7" Single
"I Could Be" – 3:01
"I Could Be" (Instrumental) – 3:01
12" Single
"I Could Be" (Special U.S. Extended Mix) – 6:00
"I Could Be" – 3:01
"I Could Be" (Instrumental) – 3:01

Notes
 Discogs.com – "I Could Be" (song information)

Sinitta songs
1983 debut singles
Songs written by George Hargreaves (politician)
1983 songs